Jean-René Pierre Goetgheluck Le Rouge Tillard des Acres de Presfontaines, whose pseudonym was Jean Mitry (7 November 1904  – 18 January 1988), was a French film theorist, critic and filmmaker, a co-founder of France's first film society, and, in 1938, of the Cinémathèque Française.

Work
Goetgheluck le Rouge Rillard des Acres de Presfontaines was born in Soissons and was the first lecturer of film aesthetics in France, Mitry was one of the first intellectuals responsible for taking film studies out of the era of the film club and into that of the university.

Mitry was one of few major film theorists who worked in film production himself. He edited Alexandre Astruc's short film Le Rideau Cramoisi (1953) and directed two films of his own, Pacific 231 (1949), set to Arthur Honegger's music, and Images pour Debussy (1952), set to the music of Claude Debussy.

He died in La Garenne-Colombes in 1988.

Selected filmography
 The Enigma of the Folies-Bergere (1959)

Works
 Introduction to film aesthetics (1960)
 Dictionary of cinema (1963)
 The Aesthetics and Psychology of the Cinema (1965)
 History of cinema, 5 volumes (1967–1980)
 Experimental Cinema: History and perspectives (1974)
 Semiotics and the Analysis of Film (new edition 2000)

1904 births
1988 deaths
People from Soissons
French film critics
Film theorists
French male writers